Holle is a surname. Notable people with the surname include:

Alexander Holle (1898–1978), German soldier
Eric Holle (born 1960), American football player
Fred Holle (born 1931), American artist
Gary Holle (born 1954), American baseball player
Karel Holle (1829-1896), Dutch colonial administrator
Lienhart Holle (fl. 1478-92), printer from Ulm, Germany
Mabel Holle (1920–2011), American baseball player
Ryan Holle (born 1982), American murderer